Frank Taubert (born 10 March 1956) is a German diver. He competed at the 1976 Summer Olympics and the 1980 Summer Olympics.

References

1956 births
Living people
German male divers
Olympic divers of East Germany
Divers at the 1976 Summer Olympics
Divers at the 1980 Summer Olympics
Divers from Dresden
20th-century German people